The 1983–84 season was Blackpool F.C.'s 76th season (73rd consecutive) in the Football League. They competed in the 24-team Division Four, then the bottom tier of English league football, finishing sixth. 

Paul Stewart and Keith Mercer were the club's joint-top goalscorers, with twelve goals apiece.

Table

References

Blackpool F.C.
Blackpool F.C. seasons